Kenzo Tagawa (born 31 October 1996) is a Japanese judoka.

He is the gold medallist of the 2018 Judo Grand Slam Düsseldorf in the -66 kg category.

References

External links
 

1996 births
Living people
Japanese male judoka
20th-century Japanese people
21st-century Japanese people